Fan Linlin (born 1 December 1991 in Beijing) is a Chinese volleyball player. She was the spiker of the China women's national volleyball team. She plays in Army club.

References
 Profile at fivb.org

External links 
 

1991 births
Living people
Chinese women's volleyball players
Volleyball players from Beijing
Wing spikers
21st-century Chinese women